Manju Swaraj is an Indian film director, screenwriter who works in Kannada cinema. He rose to fame with 2009 film Shishira, 2013Shravani Subramanya.2017Srikanta and 2017Pataki, 2019Mane Maratakkide.

Career
Manju Swaraj started his film career by working as an assistant director to Nagathihalli Chandrashekhar in 2005 film Amrithadhare. He made his direction debut in 2009 film Shishira which got positive reviews and was remade in Tamil and dubbed for Telugu, Malayalam and Hindi. He introduced Ajaneesh Lokanath  as Music director From movie Shishira to KFI. In 2013 he directed Shravani Subramanya casting Ganesh and Amulya which became one of the major blockbusters of 2013 by completing 100 days. Manju Swaraj then directed Srikanta in 2017 casting Dr Shiva Rajkumar which became successful. His next film is Pataki another Blockbuster with Ganesh which is a remake of 2015 Telugu film Pataas. In 2019 directed [Mane Maratakkide] movie with major comedians of KFI Sadhukokila | KuriPratap | Ravishankar Gowda which was Laughbuster and First 100 Days Movie of the year 2020.

Personal life
Manju Swaraj was born on 6 October in Mysore, Karnataka, India. He completed his school from St. Joseph's High School, Mysore and pre-university course from Vishwamanava PU College, Mandya. Manju completed his graduation from SBRR Mahajana Degree College, Mysore. His uncle Professor Krishne Gowda is a famous Kannada stand-up comedian and retired principal. Manju married Sahana in 2016.

Filmography
 As Director

References

External links 

Living people
Film directors from Bangalore
Kannada film directors
21st-century Indian film directors
Screenwriters from Bangalore
Kannada screenwriters
1982 births